The year 2005 is the seventh year in the history of King of the Cage, a mixed martial arts promotion based in the United States. In 2005 King of the Cage held 19 events, KOTC - Australia.

Title fights

Events list

KOTC: Australia

KOTC: Australia was an event held on February 4, 2005 in Australia.

Results

KOTC 47: Uprising

KOTC 47: Uprising was an event held on February 5, 2005 at the Albuquerque Convention Center in Albuquerque, New Mexico, United States.

Results

KOTC 48: Payback

KOTC 48: Payback was an event held on February 25, 2005 in Cleveland, Ohio, United States.

Results

KOTC 49: Soboba

KOTC 49: Soboba was an event held on March 20, 2005 in San Jacinto, California, United States.

Results

KOTC 50: First Blood

KOTC 50: First Blood was an event held on March 26, 2005 in New Mexico, United States.

Results

KOTC 51: Natural Disaster

KOTC 51: Natural Disaster was an event held on April 15, 2005 in El Paso, Texas, United States.

Results

KOTC: Mortal Sins

KOTC: Mortal Sins was an event held on May 7, 2005 in Primm, Nevada, United States.

Results

KOTC: Red Rock

KOTC: Red Rock was an event held on May 21, 2005 in New Mexico, United States.

Results

KOTC 54: Mucho Machismo

KOTC 54: Mucho Machismo was an event held on June 12, 2005 in San Jacinto, California, United States.

Results

KOTC 55: Grudge Match

KOTC 55: Grudge Match was an event held on June 17, 2005 the Kiva Auditorium in Albuquerque, New Mexico, United States.

Results

KOTC: Warzone

KOTC: Warzone was an event held on June 24, 2005 in Sheffield, England.

Results

KOTC 56: Caliente

KOTC 56: Caliente was an event held on July 9, 2005 in Globe, Arizona, United States.

Results

KOTC: Socorro

KOTC: Socorro was an event held on July 23, 2005 in Socorro, New Mexico, United States.

Results

KOTC 58: Prime Time

KOTC 58: Prime Time was an event held on August 5, 2005 at the Soboba Casino in San Jacinto, California, United States.

Results

KOTC: Xtreme Edge

KOTC: Xtreme Edge was an event held on September 17, 2005 in Indianapolis, Indiana, United States.

Results

KOTC 61: Flash Point

KOTC 61: Flash Point was an event held on September 23, 2005 in San Jacinto, California, United States.

Results

KOTC: Execution Day

KOTC: Execution Day was an event held on October 29, 2005 at the Silver Legacy Casino in Reno, Nevada, United States.

Results

KOTC 63: Final Conflict

KOTC 63: Final Conflict was an event held on December 2, 2005 at the Soboba Casino in San Jacinto, California, United States.

Results

KOTC 64: Raging Bull

KOTC 64: Raging Bull was an event held on December 16, 2005 at the Agora Theater in Cleveland, Ohio, United States.

Results

See also 
 King of the Cage
 List of King of the Cage events
 List of King of the Cage champions

References

King of the Cage events
2005 in mixed martial arts